Harwood is an unincorporated community in Chicot County, Arkansas, United States.

In 1915, it was the site of the 5,000-acre Florence Plantation.

Notes

Unincorporated communities in Chicot County, Arkansas
Unincorporated communities in Arkansas